Majid Maayouf  is a Qatari football defender who played for Qatar in the 1984 Asian Cup.

Record at FIFA Tournaments

References

External links

1961 births
Living people
Qatari footballers
Qatar Stars League players
Qatar youth international footballers
Qatar international footballers
1984 AFC Asian Cup players
Association football defenders